State Route 296 (SR 296) is a south–north state highway located in the east-central part of the U.S. state of Georgia. It functions like a western bypass of Wrens. The highway travels from US 1/US 221/SR 4/SR 17 north of Louisville to SR 17 northwest of Wrens.

SR 296 was formerly part of SR 16, which used to travel southeast of Warrenton. When SR 16 was shifted southward, it was redesignated as SR 16 Connector (SR 16 Conn.). The connector, which only existed for about a year, was redesignated as SR 296.

Route description
Just before that intersection, the highway assumes more of a northerly routing to the town of Stapleton, where it intersects SR 102. After leaving Stapleton, SR 296 assumes a more northeasterly routing.

SR 296 mainly serves to connect US 1/US 221/SR 4 and SR 17 with the town of Stapleton. Largely a rural route, SR 296 sees an Average Annual Daily Traffic (AADT) of less than 2,000 vehicles.

History
In 1952, the path of SR 16 southeast of Warrenton was shifted southward, replacing the path of SR 16S. The portion from northwest of Wrens to north of Louisville was redesignated as SR 16 Conn. The next year, the path of SR 16 Conn. was redesignated as SR 296.

Major intersections

See also

References

296
Transportation in Jefferson County, Georgia
Transportation in Glascock County, Georgia
Transportation in Warren County, Georgia